Cathie Pelletier (born 1953) is a novelist and songwriter who was born and raised in Allagash, a rural town in Aroostook County, Maine.

Biography 

Pelletier displayed such aptitude as a student that she was advanced two grades (the sixth grade and her senior year), graduating high school at the age of sixteen. Pelletier wore brash clothes that she claimed were "an outlet for her creativity." At seventeen years she was expelled from the University of Maine at Fort Kent for breaking curfew and pulling a fire alarm. Following her expulsion, she began to hitchhike across the United States. She returned to her alma mater long enough to graduate with a baccalaureate before departing to Nashville in pursuit of a career as a songwriter. Pelletier moved to Tennessee where she met the country music star Jim Glaser. The two lived together for seventeen years until they separated. She then married European-born hotel manager, Tom Viorikic, three months after they met in Canada.

Career 

While living in Tennessee Pelletier wrote her first novel, The Funeral Makers. Since then she has penned a number of works, some of which were published under her pseudonym, K.C. McKinnon. In 1998, Pelletier made international news after receiving a million-dollar advance from Doubleday for her novel Candles on Bay Street, a work that was translated into ten languages and made into a film. She has been the recipient of the New England Book Award for Fiction and the 2006 Paterson Prize. Pelletier has acted as the literary agent for several published books.

Books by this author

Widows Walk (Poetry), 1976The Funeral Makers, 1986Once Upon a Time on the Banks, 1989The Weight of Winter, 1991The Bubble Reputation, 1993A Marriage Made at Woodstock., 1994Beaming Sonny Home, 1996Running the Bulls, 2005The One-Way Bridge, 2013The Summer Experiment, 2014

Books under K.C. McKinnonDancing at the Harvest Moon, 1997Candles on Bay Street, 1998

 Joint works A Country Music Christmas, 1997The Christmas Note with Skeeter Davis, 1997The Ragin' Cajun with fiddler Doug KershawProving Einstein Right: The Daring Expeditions that Changed How We Look at the Universe'', with S. James Gates, (2019) .

Song-writing career 
In addition to her literary triumphs, she has had songs recorded by David Byrne, Texas Tornados, Glaser Brothers.

References

1953 births
Living people
20th-century American novelists
21st-century American novelists
American women novelists
People from Aroostook County, Maine
University of Maine at Fort Kent alumni
Novelists from Maine
20th-century American women writers
21st-century American women writers